Five Miles from Hope is the debut studio album from American singer and multi-instrumentalist Mindy Jostyn, released in 1995. "Time, Be On My Side" is a duet with Carly Simon. Garth Hudson plays accordion on "Common Ground" and Donald Fagen plays melodica on "Too Easy".

Critical reception

In a contemporary review, Steven C. Johnson of The Record considered Five Miles from Hope to be an "auspicious debut". He commented: "Jostyn crafts poignant, intelligent songs, and at times, sings them with utter abandon. The songs on this debut reveal just how wide Jostyn's range is and just how many emotions she can plausibly convey in her music." Steve Morse of The Boston Globe felt the album "proves Jostyn to be a skilled songwriter", but felt "her singing isn't quite on par with her instrumental skills".

AllMusic selected Five Miles from Hope as an "album pick", with Richard Meyer describing it as "folk-rock" with a "soul/jazz tinge". He praised Jostyn's "expressive" vocals and the "crisp stadium folk sound", concluding "If you like the best aspects of Melissa Manchester, Pat Benatar or Patty Smyth, this a record worth checking out."

Track listing

Personnel
 Mindy Jostyn - vocals, violin, harmonica, acoustic guitar
 Marc Muller - electric guitar, acoustic guitar, pedal steel, mandolin
 Shane Fontayne - electric guitar
 Hugh McDonald - bass
 Gary Burke - drums, Hammer dulcimer

Additional musicians
 Ben Odom, Theresa Sergick, Rose Odom - backing vocals
 Carly Simon - vocals (track 2)
 Garth Hudson - accordion (track 8)
 Donald Fagen - melodica (track 11)
 Larry Packer - violin (track 12)
 Rob Turner - cello (track 12)

Production
 Gary Burke - producer
 Paul Antonell - recording

Other
 Tony Nagelmann - photography
 Corsillo/Manzone - art direction

References

1995 debut albums
Mindy Jostyn albums
Demon Music Group albums